Tetramethylthiourea is a commercially available organic compound used in organic syntheses. The core of the compound is thiourea, with each nitrogen connected to two methyl groups.

References

Thioureas